The redfin wrasse, Cirrhilabrus rubripinnis, is a species of wrasse native to the coral reefs of Indonesia and Philippines. It can be found in the aquarium trade.

References

External links
 

Redfin wrasse
Taxa named by John Ernest Randall
Fish described in 1980